Events in the year 1942 in Belgium

Incumbents
Monarch (in captivity): Leopold III
Prime Minister (in exile): Hubert Pierlot
 Head of German occupying forces: Alexander von Falkenhausen
 Head of the administrative staff of the Occupation: Eggert Reeder

Events
 1 January – Belgian government in exile becomes a signatory of the Atlantic Charter.
 3 January – Occupying forces prohibit listening to radio broadcasts not subject to German control.
 21 January – Eleven hostages killed by the occupying forces.
 25 January – Temperatures reach 12 below zero Celsius.
 6 March – Decree issued for the recruitment of forced labour for German factories.
 10 March – Walloon Legion parades in Brussels.
 1 April – Hendrik de Man opposes the unified trade union 
 5 April – Court of Cassation finds that secretaries-general, civil servants appointed to lead ministries in the absence of the government, have no legislative powers, annulling the decree of 15 February 1941 instituting administrative legislation.
 9 April – Decree obliging miners to work Sundays and feast days.
 16 April – Decree prohibits the establishment of new businesses or expansion of existing businesses.
 9 May – Daily meat ration reduced from 35 grammes to 20 grammes.
 27 May – Decree obliging Jews to wear an identifying Star of David.
 2 July – Prime Minister in exile broadcasts an appeal to all Belgians to defend their country.
 13 July – Secret meetings between representatives of the Christian Democrat, Liberal and Labour parties to discuss post-war policy.
 18 July – Booksellers receive a list of 1,470 titles that they are no longer permitted to stock or sell.
 26 July – A hundred Communists detained for deportation to Germany.
 31 August – Belgian section of the Red Orchestra dismantled.
 6 October – All men aged between 18 and 50 obliged to find work either in Belgium or in Germany.

Births
 18 July – Prince Alexandre of Belgium (died 2009)
 20 September – Robbe De Hert, film director (died 2020)
 2 May – Jacques Rogge, 8th President of the International Olympic Committee (died 2021)

Deaths
 22 January – Reimond Tollenaere (born 1909), collaborator
 3 April – Paul Gilson (born 1865), composer
 22 October – Staf De Clercq (born 1884), quisling

References

 
1940s in Belgium